Rhiannon Wryn (formerly credited as Rhiannon Leigh Wryn) is an American actress. She had lead roles in the 2007 film The Last Mimzy and the 2010 film Monster Mutt. She was nominated for both a Saturn Award and a Young Artist Award for her performance in The Last Mimzy.

Filmography
2003: Hulk - Young Betty Ross
2005: The King of Queens (TV Series) - Little Simone
2007: The Last Mimzy - Emma Wilder
2008: The Sophisticates - Weezy
2011: Monster Mutt - Ashley Taylor
2012: Widow Detective (TV Movie) - Ella Jarrett
2013: All American Christmas Carol - Scrooge
2018: Camping (TV Series) - Tyler

References

External links

Living people
Year of birth unknown
American actresses
American child actresses
Place of birth missing (living people)
21st-century American women
2000 births